Node is an Italian death metal band formed in Milan in 1994 and currently signed to Punishment 18 Records. Their last (sixth) full-length studio album, Cowards Empire was released in 2016.

Members
CN Sid (since 2012)
Gary D'Eramo – guitar (since 1995, except 1997–2000)
Rudy Gonella Diaza – guitar (since 2012)
Davide (Dero) De Robertis (since 2012)
Pietro Battanta – drums (since 2010)

Former members
Daniel Botti – vocals and guitar (1997–2009)
Giacomo Lavatura – vocals (2010–2012)
Marco Di Salvia – drums (2002–2011)
Klaus Mariani – bass (1995–2010)
Steve Minelli – guitar (1994–1999)
Giuseppe Caruso – vocals (2009–2010)
Mario Giannini – drums (2001–2002)
Joe La Viola – drums (1999–2000)
Loris Pacaccio – drums (1998–1999)
Oinos – drums (1996–1998)
John Manti – drums (1995–1996)
Andrea "Attila" Caniato – guitar (2009–2011)
Gabriel Pignata – bass (2009–2011)

Discography

Studio albums
Technical Crime (Lucretia Records, 1997—remastered, Scarlet, 2004)
Sweatshops (Scarlet, 2002)
Das Kapital (Scarlet, 2004)
As God Kills (Massacre Records, 2006)
In the End Everything Is a Gag (Scarlet, 2010)
Cowards Empire (2016)

EPs
Ask (Lucretia Records, 1995—remastered, Scarlet, 2004)
Sterilized (Lucretia Records, 2000)

Demos
Grind Revolution in Mass Evolution (self-produced, 1994)
Land of Nod (self-produced, 2000)

References

External links
Official website

Italian death metal musical groups
Musical groups established in 1994
Musical quintets
Scarlet Records artists
Massacre Records artists
Musical groups from Milan